The Immaculate Heart of Mary Church is a Catholic church in Kemerovo, in the region of Kuzbass, Russia. It was consecrated in 2009 and serves the diocese of Novosibirsk. This is the second Catholic church in the area to be built since the Revolution of October 1917. The first church on the site is St. John Novokuznetsk, dedicated a few years ago.

History
The priests of the Congregation of the Redemptorists have been active in the area of Kuzbass since 1996, but congregations were held in private apartments. The first Mass was held on December 22, 1996, in a rented room of the house of culture. The parish had to wait ten years before receiving permission to build a church, which was consecrated on September 27, 2009, in honor of the Immaculate Heart of Mary, with the participation of Bishop Joseph Werth, head of the diocese.

See also

Roman Catholicism in Russia

References

Roman Catholic churches in Russia
Kemerovo
Roman Catholic churches completed in 2009
2009 establishments in Russia